Cleridge, also known as Sunnyside Farm, is a historic home and farm complex located near Stephenson, in Frederick County, Virginia.  The main house was built about 1790, and is a 2 1/2-story, five bay, Federal style brick dwelling. It has a 2 1/2-story, four bay, brick addition added in 1882–1883.  Also on the property are the contributing brick well structure, the frame icehouse/blacksmith shop, a frame carriage house, the brick-entry, a
frame poultry house, and a farm manager's house (c. 1815). The cultivated and forested land is considered a contributing agricultural site.

It was listed on the National Register of Historic Places in 2011.

References

Farms on the National Register of Historic Places in Virginia
Federal architecture in Virginia
Houses completed in 1790
Houses in Clarke County, Virginia
National Register of Historic Places in Clarke County, Virginia